Edward F. Book (born September 23, 1970) is an American-New Zealand former professional basketball player. Listed at 211 cm (6'11") and 112 kg, Book played the centre position.

Playing career
Born in Buffalo, New York, Book was educated at Canisius College, but came to New Zealand in 1994 to play in the NBL. He was consistently one of the best post players in the league, winning Outstanding Forward in 1996, Outstanding Kiwi Forward in 2002 and named to the All-Star Five both years. He played in every NBL season between 1994 and 2007, winning a championship with the Nelson Giants in his final season.

Book debuted for the Tall Blacks against China in 2002, filling the one available naturalized player spot under FIBA rules. He earned hero status during the world championship campaign after stepping into a starting role to fill in for Sean Marks. Book's three-point shooting ability made him a difficult match-up for opposing centres. Book helped New Zealand to a silver medal at the 2006 Commonwealth Games and announced his retirement from the Tall Blacks immediately after the final.

Coaching career
Book served as an assistant coach for the Nelson Giants in 2013 and 2014.

In March 2022, Book was appointed an assistant coach of the Canterbury Rams.

Personal life
Book and his wife Lisa have three children: Josh, Amiee and Nic. All three of his children play basketball, while Lisa is a former national league guard and junior Tall Fern.

As of October 2018, Book was a teacher at Waimea College.

References

External links
Canisius Golden Griffins bio
sports-reference college stats
eurobasket.com player profile
olympic.org profile
basketball-reference International stats

1970 births
Living people
2002 FIBA World Championship players
American men's basketball players
Basketball players at the 2004 Summer Olympics
Basketball players at the 2006 Commonwealth Games
Basketball players from Buffalo, New York
Canisius Golden Griffins men's basketball players
Centers (basketball)
Commonwealth Games medallists in basketball
Commonwealth Games silver medallists for New Zealand
Manawatu Jets players
Nelson Giants players
New Zealand men's basketball players
Olympic basketball players of New Zealand
Wellington Saints players
Medallists at the 2006 Commonwealth Games